{{safesubst:#invoke:RfD|||month = March
|day = 18
|year = 2023
|time = 17:23
|timestamp = 20230318172357

|content=
REDIRECT Hip hop (disambiguation)

}}